The Lepidoptera of Iceland consist of both the butterflies and moths recorded from Iceland.

Butterflies

Nymphalidae
Aglais io (Linnaeus, 1758)
Aglais urticae (Linnaeus, 1758)
Vanessa atalanta (Linnaeus, 1758)
Vanessa cardui (Linnaeus, 1758)

Pieridae
Pieris brassicae (Linnaeus, 1758)
Pieris rapae (Linnaeus, 1758)

Moths

Coleophoridae
Coleophora algidella Staudinger, 1857
Coleophora alticolella Zeller, 1849

Crambidae
Crambus pascuella (Linnaeus, 1758)
Gesneria centuriella (Denis & Schiffermuller, 1775)
Nomophila noctuella (Denis & Schiffermuller, 1775)
Udea ferrugalis (Hübner, 1796)

Erebidae
Catocala fraxini (Linnaeus, 1758)
Orgyia antiqua (Linnaeus, 1758)
Scoliopteryx libatrix (Linnaeus, 1758)

Gelechiidae
Bryotropha similis (Stainton, 1854)
Gnorimoschema valesiella (Staudinger, 1877)
Scrobipalpa atriplicella (Fischer von Röslerstamm, 1841)
Scrobipalpa samadensis (Pfaffenzeller, 1870)
Sitotroga cerealella (Olivier, 1789)

Geometridae
Dysstroma citrata (Linnaeus, 1761)
Entephria caesiata (Denis & Schiffermuller, 1775)
Entephria flavicinctata (Hübner, 1813)
Epirrhoe alternata (Muller, 1764)
Erannis defoliaria (Clerck, 1759)
Eupithecia nanata (Hübner, 1813)
Eupithecia plumbeolata (Haworth, 1809)
Eupithecia pusillata (Denis & Schiffermuller, 1775)
Eupithecia satyrata (Hübner, 1813)
Hydriomena furcata (Thunberg, 1784)
Nycterosea obstipata (Fabricius, 1794)
Operophtera brumata (Linnaeus, 1758)
Perizoma blandiata (Denis & Schiffermuller, 1775)
Perizoma minorata (Treitschke, 1828)
Rheumaptera hastata (Linnaeus, 1758)
Xanthorhoe decoloraria (Esper, 1806)
Xanthorhoe designata (Hufnagel, 1767)

Momphidae
Mompha conturbatella (Hübner, 1819)

Noctuidae
Agrochola circellaris (Hufnagel, 1766)
Agrotis ipsilon (Hufnagel, 1766)
Agrotis segetum (Denis & Schiffermuller, 1775)
Apamea exulis (Lefebvre, 1836)
Autographa gamma (Linnaeus, 1758)
Caradrina clavipalpis Scopoli, 1763
Ceramica pisi (Linnaeus, 1758)
Cerapteryx graminis (Linnaeus, 1758)
Diarsia mendica (Fabricius, 1775)
Eupsilia transversa (Hufnagel, 1766)
Eurois occulta (Linnaeus, 1758)
Euxoa ochrogaster (Guenee, 1852)
Fabula zollikoferi (Freyer, 1836)
Helotropha leucostigma (Hübner, 1808)
Hydraecia micacea (Esper, 1789)
Hypocoena stigmatica (Eversmann, 1855)
Mniotype adusta (Esper, 1790)
Mythimna unipuncta (Haworth, 1809)
Noctua comes Hübner, 1813
Noctua pronuba (Linnaeus, 1758)
Parastichtis suspecta (Hübner, 1817)
Peridroma saucia (Hübner, 1808)
Phlogophora meticulosa (Linnaeus, 1758)
Rhizedra lutosa (Hübner, 1803)
Rhyacia quadrangula (Zetterstedt, 1839)
Standfussiana lucernea (Linnaeus, 1758)
Syngrapha interrogationis (Linnaeus, 1758)
Xestia c-nigrum (Linnaeus, 1758)
Xylena exsoleta (Linnaeus, 1758)
Xylena vetusta (Hübner, 1813)

Oecophoridae
Endrosis sarcitrella (Linnaeus, 1758)
Hofmannophila pseudospretella (Stainton, 1849)

Plutellidae
Plutella xylostella (Linnaeus, 1758)
Rhigognostis senilella (Zetterstedt, 1839)

Pterophoridae
Amblyptilia acanthadactyla (Hübner, 1813)
Emmelina monodactyla (Linnaeus, 1758)
Stenoptilia islandicus (Staudinger, 1857)

Pyralidae
Ephestia elutella (Hübner, 1796)
Ephestia kuehniella Zeller, 1879
Matilella fusca (Haworth, 1811)
Plodia interpunctella (Hübner, 1813)

Sphingidae
Acherontia atropos (Linnaeus, 1758)
Agrius convolvuli (Linnaeus, 1758)
Hippotion celerio (Linnaeus, 1758)
Hyles gallii (Rottemburg, 1775)
Macroglossum stellatarum (Linnaeus, 1758)

Tineidae
Monopis laevigella (Denis & Schiffermuller, 1775)
Nemapogon variatella (Clemens, 1859)
Tinea translucens Meyrick, 1917
Tineola bisselliella (Hummel, 1823)

Tortricidae
Acleris maccana (Treitschke, 1835)
Acleris notana (Donovan, 1806)
Apotomis sororculana (Zetterstedt, 1839)
Cochylis dubitana (Hübner, 1799)
Cydia pomonella (Linnaeus, 1758)
Eana osseana (Scopoli, 1763)
Epinotia caprana (Fabricius, 1798)
Epinotia solandriana (Linnaeus, 1758)
Lobesia littoralis (Westwood & Humphreys, 1845)
Notocelia rosaecolana (Doubleday, 1850)
Zeiraphera griseana (Hübner, 1799)

References

External links
Fauna Europaea
Checklist of the Noctuidae of Iceland

Iceland
Iceland
 
Lepidoptera